Crime After School (German: Verbrechen nach Schulschluß) is a 1975 West German-Hungarian crime drama film directed by Alfred Vohrer and starring Teri Tordai, Herbert Fleischmann and Sascha Hehn. It is an anthology film with three episodes and is not a remake of Alfred Vohrer's 1959 film with the same title.

Cast
 Teri Tordai as Tina Gregor
 Herbert Fleischmann as Alexander Gregor 
 Sascha Hehn as Franz Brugger 
 Malte Thorsten as Karl Sperber 
 Achim Neumann as Ulli 
 Oliver Collignon as Oliver Behringer 
 Evelyne Kraft as Sabine 
 Pierre Franckh as Götz Overmeier 
 Felix Franchy as Hannes Melzer 
 Marie Zürer as Betty

References

Bibliography
 Bock, Hans-Michael & Bergfelder, Tim. The Concise CineGraph. Encyclopedia of German Cinema. Berghahn Books, 2009.
 Goble, Alan. The Complete Index to Literary Sources in Film. Walter de Gruyter, 1999.

External links 
 

1975 films
1975 crime drama films
German crime drama films
West German films
Hungarian crime drama films
1970s German-language films
Films directed by Alfred Vohrer
German anthology films
Constantin Film films
1970s German films